Roger Noel Taber (born December 1945) is an English poet and novelist.

Raised in Kent, he graduated from the University of Kent during 1973. He is a librarian by profession, and currently lives in London. He has written for various poetry magazines and anthologies across England and America. Openly gay, he writes psycho-sociological poetry about both the homosexual and heterosexual communities, often experimenting with voices. Although he usually employs a first person narrative, Taber's works are a blend of observation, role play and personal experiences. A popular quote often published in his poetry collections is: 'Colour, creed, sex, sexuality... These are but part of a whole'.

Aside from poetry he has also written several novels, two of which have been published.

On Tuesday 14 July 2009 Roger N. Taber participated in UK sculptor Antony Gormley's  'One And Other' live arts project (Week 2) as one of 2,400 people selected at random to capture a moment in time on the 4th plinth in London's Trafalgar Square. This significant archival project – designed to run continuously 24/7 for 100 days – expresses not only the diversity of the UK population but also the human psyche. Taber read a selection of his own poetry, including poems on gay and transgender themes among others intended to represent his perspective on contemporary society.

Bibliography
Poetry

Novels
Blasphemy (2006) 
Sacrilege (2008) 
Catching Up With Murder (2011)

References

External links
A Poet's blog R.N Taber's official blog

1945 births
Living people
Alumni of the University of Kent
English male poets
21st-century English novelists
English gay writers
English LGBT poets
English LGBT novelists
English male novelists
21st-century English male writers